Jean Bindzi Ebila Mbida (born 9 April 1990) is a Cameroonian footballer who currently plays as a midfielder for FBC Gravina.

Career
Mbida began his career in 2005 in the Allievi Nazionali of Vicenza Calcio and signed after three years in 2008 for Inter Milan in a 5-year contract. Nicolas Giani also joined opposite direction that season; Giani valued €1,000, thus 50% rights worth €500, and Mbida's half valued €60,000. In July 2009 was loaned to Como Calcio but the loan was cancelled in January 2010.

In June 2010, he was bought back by Vicenza, made Inter register a loss of €71,000 (contract residual value €72,000 (€120,000 times 3 years/5 years) minus €1,000) but also register a financial income of €59,500 (rounded to €60,000, book value of another half minus market value €500), which it only made a net loss of €11,500 to Inter.

In August 2010 he left for Savona.

On 1 July 2011 Mbida returned to Vicenza and awarded no.36 shirt. However, he did not play any game and hospitalized on 5 November 2011 due to high fever.

Mbida became a free agent on 1 July 2012 and did not train with Vicenza in pre-season. In late July 2012 Mbida was signed by Serie A club Calcio Catania, rejoining Alberto Frison, and the contract was documented by Lega Serie A on 2 August 2012.

References

External links

1990 births
Living people
Cameroonian footballers
Association football fullbacks
L.R. Vicenza players
Inter Milan players
Como 1907 players
Savona F.B.C. players
Catania S.S.D. players
Slovenian PrvaLiga players
ND Gorica players
Cameroonian expatriate footballers
Expatriate footballers in Italy
Expatriate footballers in Slovenia